= Voice teacher (disambiguation) =

A voice teacher is a person who instructs others in improving their skills as a singer or speaker.
